Ayelet Zussman (Hebrew: איילת זוסמן‎, born 1979) is an Israeli rhythmic gymnastics coach and formerly a gymnast, she was champion of Israel in 1994.

Career 
Ayelet took her first steps in the world of rhythmic gymnastics when she was 6 years old. She trained for a year under former Israeli national team coach Ilanit Lazar and then went to Irina Vigdorchik as Ilanit left the country.

In 1994, at the age of 15, she became the champion of Israel, she could not repeat her achievement a year later due to a back injury and at the age of 17 she decided to end her career as an athlete. She served as a physical training officer in the general staff of the Israeli Army. At the end of military service, Ayelet was asked to remain in the army with a contract ready, but she decided to return to gymnastics, this time as a coach.

A graduate of the Ruppin Academic Center, she has a bachelor's degree in business administration and sports management.

Since 2009, she has been the coach of Linoy Ashram, a multiple winner of World and European Championships, as well as the Tokyo Olympic champion. And a choreographer for Neta Rivkin, and the rhythmic gymnastics' group. 

After her achievement in Tokyo she's been appointed as the head coach of the Israeli rhythmic gymnastics team until 2028, meaning Zussman is currently not only coaching the nation's top individuals, like Daria Atamanov the 2022 European champion, but the group as well after Vigdorchik went to train the Russian team.

References 

1979 births
Living people
Israeli rhythmic gymnasts